Faafetai Iutana (born 24 May 1977) is a Samoan former wrestler. He competed in the men's Greco-Roman 76 kg at the 2000 Summer Olympics.

References

External links
 

1977 births
Living people
Samoan male sport wrestlers
Olympic wrestlers of Samoa
Wrestlers at the 2000 Summer Olympics
Place of birth missing (living people)
20th-century Samoan people
21st-century Samoan people